The Kyuyol-Yuryakh (Küöl-ürex) is a river in the Sakha Republic (Yakutia), Russia.

The river flows north of the Arctic Circle, across territories of the East Siberian Lowland in Allaikhovsky District. It flows across Soluntakh, the largest lake in the area. There are no settlements along its course. The name of the river comes from the Yakut "Kuöl/urekh" (Күөл-үрэх), meaning "lake/river".

Course
The Kyuyol-Yuryakh has its sources in a small lake of the northern end of the Yana-Indigirka Lowland, to the east of the Muksunuokha basin. The river heads first roughly southwards across a tundra area marked by permafrost and numerous small lakes. After a stretch it bends and flows in an ESE direction until it meets the  western shore of lake Soluntakh, forming the primary inflow of the relatively large lake. The Kyuyol-Yuryakh then flows out of the lake from the eastern shore, meandering strongly in a ENE direction for a stretch, after which it turns southeastward to the north of the course of the Uryung-Ulakh, the main tributary of the Khroma. Finally it ends in lake Usun-Ulakh-Tubata (Усун-Уулаах-Тубата), entering it from the northwest.

Tributaries  
The river is frozen between early October and mid June.

See also
List of rivers of Russia

References

External links 
Fishing & Tourism in Yakutia
Закон Республики Саха (Якутия) от 30.11
Map showing survey route followed during the current study of Siberian cranes

Drainage basins of the East Siberian Sea
Rivers of the Sakha Republic
East Siberian Lowland